Anti-Venom is a fictional antihero appearing in Comic books published by Marvel Comics. It first appeared in The Amazing Spider-Man #569 (August 2008), and was created by Dan Slott and John Romita Jr. The creature belongs to a race of amorphous extraterrestrial parasites known as the Symbiotes and is regarded as Venom's symbiotic brother. His physical features include white "skin", a black face, and spider symbol across his chest.

Hosts

Eddie Brock

The 2008 story "New Ways to Die" features the first appearance of Anti-Venom. Eddie Brock gets a job at a soup kitchen under Martin Li. Brock is unknowingly cured of his cancer by Martin Li, who possesses the Lightforce abilities, and Brock believes it to be a miracle. After Brock is attacked by Mac Gargan (the Venom symbiote's current host), the Venom symbiote attempts to reunite with Brock, at which point Brock's skin becomes caustic to the Venom symbiote. Brock is enveloped in a new white “Anti-Venom” symbiote when remnants of the Venom symbiote in his body merge with special antibodies (produced by his white blood cells) due to Li's Lightforce energy. Eddie later sacrificed his Anti-Venom symbiote to cure people from the Spider-Queen's spider-virus during the Spider-Island event.

Ishaan Pai (Second Host)
During the "AXIS" storyline, a new version of Anti-Venom is seen in the crowd of new heroes attending a "self help" style seminar being held by Roderick Kingsley (aka the original Hobgoblin). All the new heroes have been given heroic personas by Kingsley that already exist, but are no longer used. It is not shown whether the new Anti-Venom is indeed a symbiote or just a man in a suit designed to look like the original Anti-Venom symbiote. However, the speech bubble used for the character is stylized in a way to suggest a distortion of the character's voice similar to the way Eddie Brock spoke when bonded with the Anti-Venom symbiote.

Eugene "Flash" Thompson

In the comic "Venom Inc.", Venom got captured by The Life Foundation and was experimented on. The Life Foundation accidentally poured malic acid on Venom which caused a chemical reaction in his body turning him into Anti-Venom. Anti-Venom got new abilities including the ability to phase through any solid object. He used it to escape the Life Foundation and bond with one of the scientists who happens to be Flash Thompson. Flash decides to use the symbiote for good and becomes "Agent Venom".

Powers and abilities
Anyone possessed by the Anti-Venom symbiote possesses superhuman strength, durability, and stamina, an accelerated and fast healing factor, genetic memory, detection of its Symbiote offspring, wall-crawling, web-generating abilities, spider-senses, immunity to Spider-Man's spider-senses, and camouflage.

Unlike the other Symbiotes, the original Anti-Venom symbiote used by Eddie Brock is immune to fire, heat, and sound-based attacks. In addition, the Anti-Venom symbiote can produce antibodies that can "cure" a person afflicted by things like radioactivity, parasites, diseases, and drugs. The new Anti-Venom symbiote used by Flash Thompson has the ability to heal physical injuries as well. Due to its failed attempt at curing Spider-Man's radiation-based powers, the Anti-Venom symbiote causes Spider-Man's powers to cancel out when they are too close of each other.

However, Anti-Venom does possess a few weaknesses of its own. It is vulnerable to high concentrations of Norman Osborn's super-venom via Freak's DNA. Additionally since Martin Li's Lightforce touch created the symbiote, Mister Negative's Darkforce touch can interfere or halt Anti-Venom's healing abilities. Also as seen during the Spider-Island event, overusing his healing powers can cause Anti-Venom's powers to weaken.

Other versions
In What If? Peter Parker became Kraven the Hunter where Peter Parker killed Kraven the Hunter and replaced Kraven as the new hunter, Madame Web hired Anti-Venom, Spider-Woman and Mac Gargan to stop Peter. Despite being successful in mortally injuring him, they were all defeated.

In other media

Television
 The Anti-Venom symbiote appears in Ultimate Spider-Man, voiced by Matt Lanter. This version is created from a sample of the Venom symbiote, with Harry Osborn as its host. In its self-titled episode, the Anti-Venom symbiote is created by Doctor Octopus and Michael Morbius as a candidate for the former's Hydra-backed Sinister Six. Anti-Venom nearly kills Agent Venom, only to be stopped by Spider-Man and Iron Patriot, leaving Anti-Venom inactive and Harry in a coma. In the three-part episode "The Symbiote Saga", Anti-Venom awakens when the Carnage symbiote attacks New York and neutralizes the latter's various hosts. However, it is almost consumed by Carnage's "heart" until Spider-Man's identity is revealed to Harry. Anti-Venom re-bonds with Harry and sacrifices itself to cure New York of Carnage's infestation, but its abilities are later claimed by the Carnage Queen.
 The Anti-Venom symbiote appears in the Spider-Man episode "Vengeance of Venom". This version is created when Groot is hit with a sonic device used by May Parker based on Max Modell's suggestion to access the alien's pollination abilities and hybridize it with symbiote power to cure the Klyntar invasion force's hosts.

Video games
 The Eddie Brock incarnation of Anti-Venom appears as a boss in Spider-Man: Edge of Time, voiced by Steve Blum. This version is brainwashed by Alchemax scientist Walker Sloan into serving the latter and nearly kills Spider-Man until Spider-Man 2099 rescues his predecessor and travels to the past to remove Sloan's implants. Freed from Sloan's control, Anti-Venom attacks him, only to accidentally push himself, Sloan, and Doctor Octopus into Sloan's time portal, fusing them into the monstrous Atrocity. Spider-Man later defeats Atrocity while helping Spider-Man 2099 save the timeline.
 The Eddie Brock incarnation of Anti-Venom appears as a playable character in Spider-Man Unlimited.
 The Eddie Brock incarnation of Anti-Venom appears as a playable character in Marvel: Avengers Alliance.
 The Anti-Venom symbiote appears as an alternate skin for Eddie Brock / Venom in Marvel: Future Fight.
 Several variations of the Anti-Venom symbiote appear in Marvel vs Capcom Infinite.
 The Anti-Venom symbiote appears as an alternate skin for Eddie Brock / Venom in Marvel Ultimate Alliance 3.
 The Eddie Brock incarnation of Anti-Venom appears as a playable character in Marvel Strike Force.
 The Eddie Brock incarnation of Anti-Venom appears as a playable character in Marvel Puzzle Quest.
 The Eddie Brock incarnation of Anti-Venom appears as a playable character in Marvel Contest of Champions.

Collected editions

References

External links
 

Characters created by Dan Slott
Characters created by John Romita Jr.
Comics characters introduced in 2008
Fictional amorphous creatures
Fictional characters who can turn invisible
Fictional characters with healing abilities
Fictional parasites and parasitoids
Fictional soldiers
Marvel Comics aliens
Marvel Comics characters who are shapeshifters
Marvel Comics characters who can move at superhuman speeds
Marvel Comics characters with accelerated healing
Marvel Comics characters with superhuman strength
Marvel Comics superheroes
Marvel Comics male superheroes
Marvel Comics extraterrestrial superheroes
Spider-Man characters
Merged fictional characters